David Iokhelevich Rosenberg,  (Russian: Давид Иохелевич Розенберг; 15/27 November 1879 in Šateikiai/Шатейкяй, Kovno district (guberniya), Russian Empire – currently Lithuania, died 17 February 1950 in Moscow), was a Soviet economist.

He joined the Jewish Labour Bund in Odessa in the early 1900s and was exiled to Narym District in Siberia in 1914. After the Russian Revolution he joined the Russian Communist Party (Bolsheviks), moved to Moscow and taught Marxist-Leninist political economy. Author of several texts that were endorsed as textbooks during the Stalin era and beyond. Was elected a corresponding member of the Academy of Sciences of the USSR in 1939. He is buried at the Novodevichy Cemetery (location 2/32/7) in Moscow.

Works 
 "Class Struggle" (1921)
 "Comments on "Capital" Karl Marx'', 1931–1933
 "History of Political Economy", 1934–1936
 Commentary to the 1st volume of Karl Marx's "Capital", (1961)
 Commentary to the 2nd and 3rd volume of Karl Marx's "Capital", (1961)

Family 
• Related to the British War poet Isaac Rosenberg. 
• Spouse: Evgenia Borisovna. 
• Children: Iosif (b1914), Ruvim (b1919) and Genrikh. Iosif and Ruvim were students at the Faculty of History, Moscow State University. During WW2 with 975th artillery regiment, 8th Rifle Division of People's Militia, both MIA since 10/1941 near Yelnya. Genrikh (d. 1990s) worked at the Moscow Geologo-Exploratory Institute (МГРИ).

References 

1879 births
1950 deaths
Lithuanian Jews
Economists from Moscow
Soviet economists